Waitaki Boys' High School is a secondary school for boys located in the northern part of the town of Oamaru, Otago, New Zealand, with day and boarding facilities, and was founded in 1883. , it has a school roll of approximately 400 students.

The school has a house system with four houses, Don, Forrester, Lee and Sutherland. It organises some cultural activities together with its nearby sister school, Waitaki Girls' High School.

The school is notable for its British colonial architecture, encompassing such historic buildings such as the Hall of Memories, an assembly hall, built to honour its former pupils who died in various wars. Most of the blocks of classrooms at Waitaki Boys High School are named after famous past students, also known as Waitakians or Old Boys. The main, and oldest block of the school is named after Denis Blundell.

History 
The idea of establishing a boys' high school in Oamaru originated with Samuel Shrimski, who was one of the two members of parliament representing the Waitaki electorate.

Rectors
The following is a complete list of the rectors of Waitaki Boys' High School:

Notable alumni

 Peter Arnett – journalist
 Fraser Barron – bomber pilot during World War II
 James Bertram – professor, journalist
 Denis Blundell – lawyer, governor-general
 Charles Brasch – poet
 Douglas Carter – former National MP for the Raglan electorate
 Gonville ffrench-Beytagh (1912–1991), Dean of Johannesburg and an anti-apartheid activist.
 Sir Malcolm Grant - chairman of NHS England and Chancellor, University of York (former Provost and President of University College London (2003–2013)
 Ron Guthrey – Mayor of Christchurch (1968–1971)
 Dean Hall – video game designer, mountaineer
 A. M. Hamilton – engineer
 Brian Henderson – newsreader in Australia
 Lindsay Merritt Inglis (1894–1966), a senior officer in the New Zealand Military Forces
 Donald Gilbert Kennedy, DSO, Navy Cross (U.S.) (1898–1976) teacher, colonial administrator and Coastwatcher during the Solomon Islands campaign (World War II).
 Douglas Lilburn – Professor, composer 
 Robert Macintosh (1897–1989), first Nuffield Professor of Anaesthetics, Oxford
 Terry McCombs – politician, headmaster 
 Greg McGee – rugby union player and playwright
 Ian McLean – politician, economist
 Arnold Nordmeyer (1901–1989), politician, Labour Party Minister of Finance 1957–1960
 David Sewell – cricketer
 Foss Shanahan – diplomat 
 Angus Tait – electronics innovator and businessman
 Des Wilson – campaigner in Britain

Footnotes

External links

 School Website
 Ministry of Education website page
 New Zealand Qualifications Authority website page

Boarding schools in New Zealand
Boys' schools in New Zealand
Educational institutions established in 1883
Secondary schools in Otago
Buildings and structures in Oamaru
1883 establishments in New Zealand